Athina Anastasaki (born 1988) is a Greek chemist who is a professor at ETH Zurich. Her research considers chemical synthesis and radical polymerisation. She was awarded the 2022 Ruzicka Prize in recognition of her research in chemistry.

Early life and education 
Anastasaki was born in Athens, Greece. Her parents are from Crete. She completed her undergraduate studies in chemistry at the National and Kapodistrian University of Athens, where she studied polymer chemistry, with a particular focus on poly(methyl methacrylate). She moved to the University of Warwick where she worked with David Haddleton. She was awarded the Royal Society of Chemistry Jon Weaver Award for the UK's best PhD in Polymer chemistry. Her doctoral research considered copper mediated living radical polymerisation. After completing her doctorate, she was made a research fellow in pharmaceutical sciences. Anastasaki was awarded an Elings Fellowship and a Global Marie Curie Fellowship to work with Craig Hawker at University of California, Santa Barbara.

Research and career 
Anastasaki joined the Department of Materials at ETH Zurich in 2019. She became an associate editor of Polymer Chemistry in 2021. Her research considers polymer synthesis and green chemistry.

Anastasaki developed a new approach to control the disparity of polymeric materials that preserved the ends of polymer chains. This strategy, which involved a switchable RAFT (Reversible addition−fragmentation chain-​transfer) agent, permits the synthesis of complex, multi-block polymers. She has also shown it is possible to regenerate the monomors of Plexiglass (poly(methyl methacrylate)) up to a 90% yield.

Anastasaki wrote a perspective on applying for a European Research Council Starting Grant for Angewandte Chemie. She outlined her "first two unsuccessful attempts to secure an ERC Starting Grant and how the lessons learned during the process led [her] to ultimately secure a grant upon [her] third attempt".

Awards and honours 
 2020 Hanwha-Total IUPAC Young Scientist Award
 2020 ERC Starting Grant
 2022 ETH Zurich Ruzicka Prize

Selected publications

References 

1988 births
Living people
Scientists from Athens
National and Kapodistrian University of Athens alumni
Alumni of the University of Warwick
Academic staff of ETH Zurich
Greek chemists
Greek women scientists